Orwell is a series of episodic simulation video games by German indie developer Osmotic Studios in which the player assumes the role of a state operative and monitors surveillance sources to find national security threats.

About  
The series is named after George Orwell, the author of the dystopian novel Nineteen Eighty-Four, references to which can be found throughout the game. The first game in the series, subtitled 'Keeping an Eye on You', was released as a five part episodic series on October 20, 2016. A three part sequel subtitled 'Ignorance is Strength' was released February 22, 2018.

Plot 

Orwell takes place in a country called The Nation, led by a paternalistic and authoritarian government known as The Party in the capital of Bonton. In 2012, The Party passed the Safety Bill, a law expanding the government's ability to spy on its citizens in the name of national security. As part of the bill the Ministry of Security, led by Secretary of Security Catherine Delacroix, commissioned a covert surveillance system codenamed Orwell.    

The player takes the role of an Orwell investigator outside of The Nation, who has just been selected to use the system. Each episode takes place over one in-game day.

Orwell: Keeping an Eye on You (2016)

Orwell: Ignorance is Strength (2018)
A sequel, entitled Orwell: Ignorance is Strength, was announced in August 2017.

Reception 

Orwell received an aggregate score of 77/100 on Metacritic, indicating generally favorable reviews. The first season was reviewed and generally well-received by multiple gaming news outlets. Destructoid considered it a potential game of the year, calling it "a fantastic nail-biter, taking all the best parts of Person of Interest, The Conversation, The Lives of Others, and putting them in a post-Snowden world." Polygon lauded the game for making a "thrilling adventure" from "how we balance our own liberty and our safety", particularly the dilemmas the game presents. GameSpot also liked that "choices matter and resonate", and praised how the game "uses simple mechanics to tell a complex and engaging story, one that feels particularly relevant". The Verge described that the game's "uncomfortable" decisions became a "selling point", saying that "it’s rare for a game to put you in such a morally compromising position".

However, Rock Paper Shotgun said that the game "takes a significant bite out of the thrill of the snoop"  because "the actual research is severely limited", and "the sense of achievement is mightily diminished". PC Gamer also criticized the game because "you don't do much actual investigation", and "the drama hangs on you deciding between two conflicting pieces of information—a gut instinct guess, with no way to further your understanding of the situation". Game Informer was even more critical of the game, saying that they did not find Orwell's treatment of surveillance and terrorism compelling, and that the game is "simply content to repeat what novels and films have more eloquently".

The follow-up Ignorance is Strength received an aggregate score of 74/100 on Metacrtic, suggesting "mixed or average reviews". Destructoid said "Orwell continues to be a solid thriller" and "the fact it’s got me thinking at all is a success in itself." However, GameSpot said that the sequel "does not leave as strong an impression as the first game did, even if the central mechanics are still inherently compelling". Rock Paper Shotgun criticized the pacing of the episodes, and that the game's introduction was not very interesting.

References

External links

 
Osmotic Studios

2016 video games
Criminal law video games
Dystopian video games
Indie video games
Single-player video games
Video games developed in Germany
Simulation video games
Windows games
Video games about mass surveillance
George Orwell
Linux games
MacOS games
Video games set in 2017